Ange Gabrielle Bawou (born 12 February 2000) is a Cameroonian footballer who plays as a goalkeeper for Bayelsa Queens and the Cameroon women's national team.

Before joining Bayelsa Queens, she played for Louves Miniproff.

Club career
Bawou has played for Louves Miniproff in Cameroon.

International career
Bawou has won the silver medal at the 2019 African Games with the Cameroon women's national under-20 team. She capped at senior level during the 2020 CAF Women's Olympic Qualifying Tournament.

References

2000 births
Living people
Cameroonian women's footballers
Women's association football goalkeepers
Competitors at the 2019 African Games
African Games silver medalists for Cameroon
Cameroon women's international footballers
African Games medalists in football
Expatriate footballers in Nigeria Women Premier League
21st-century Cameroonian women